The 2021 NRL season was the 114th season of professional rugby league in Australia and the 24th season run by the National Rugby League.

Teams

The lineup of teams remained unchanged for the 15th consecutive year.

Regular season

Bold – Home game
X – Bye
* – Golden point game
Opponent for round listed above margin

Ladder

Ladder progression

Numbers highlighted in green indicate that the team finished the round inside the top 8.
Numbers highlighted in blue indicates the team finished first on the ladder in that round.
Numbers highlighted in red indicates the team finished last place on the ladder in that round.
Underlined numbers indicate that the team had a bye during that round.

Finals series
Due to the imposition of lockdown measures in New South Wales due to a COVID-19 outbreak, all finals matches were played at neutral venues in Queensland.

Bracket

Grand final

Player statistics and records

The following statistics are as of the conclusion of Round 25.

Top 5 point scorers

Top 5 try scorers

Top 5 goal scorers

Top 5 tacklers

2021 Transfers

Players
Source:

Loan moves

Coaches

Notes

References